This is a list of municipalities in Italy which have standing links to local communities in other countries known as "town twinning" (usually in Europe) or "sister cities" (usually in the rest of the world).

A
Abano Terme

 Bad Füssing, Germany
 Lipik, Croatia
 Molos-Agios Konstantinos, Greece
 Shibukawa, Japan

Acquaviva delle Fonti
 San Miguel de Allende, Mexico

Adria

 Chieri, Italy
 Ermont, France
 Lampertheim, Germany
 Maldegem, Belgium
 Rovinj, Croatia

Agrigento

 Perm, Russia
 Tampa, United States
 Valenciennes, France
Alba

 Arlon, Belgium
 Banská Bystrica, Slovakia
 Beausoleil, France
 Böblingen, Germany
 Giresun, Turkey
 Medford, United States
 Sant Cugat del Vallès, Spain

Albano Laziale

 Białogard, Poland
 Homburg, Germany
 Koszalin, Poland

Alessandria

 Alba Iulia, Romania
 Argenteuil, France
 Hradec Králové, Czech Republic
 Jericho, Palestine
 Karlovac, Croatia
 Rosario, Argentina
 Ryazan, Russia

Alghero

 Balaguer, Spain
 Encamp, Andorra
 Palma de Mallorca, Spain
 Tarragona, Spain

Anagni

 Gniezno, Poland
 L'Isle-sur-la-Sorgue, France

Ancona

 Çeşme, Turkey
 Galaţi, Romania
 Split, Croatia
 Zadar, Croatia

Anzio

 Bad Pyrmont, Germany
 Brooklyn (New York), United States
 Caen, France
 Paphos, Cyprus

Aosta

 Albertville, France
 Chamonix-Mont-Blanc, France
 Kaolack, Senegal
 Narbonne, France
 Sinaia, Romania

Aprilia

 Ben Arous, Tunisia
 Mostardas, Brazil
 Tulcea, Romania

L'Aquila

 Bariloche, Argentina
 Bernalda, Italy
 Bistrița, Romania
 Cento, Italy
 Cuenca, Spain
 Figueira da Foz, Portugal
 Foggia, Italy
 Hobart, Australia
 Rottweil, Germany
 Sant'Angelo d'Alife, Italy
 Zielona Góra, Poland

Arco

 Belœil, Belgium
 Bogen, Germany
 Roccella Ionica, Italy
 Rýmařov, Czech Republic
 Schotten, Germany

Arenzano

 El Jadida, Morocco
 Loutraki-Perachora, Greece
 Pontoise, France
 Tata, Hungary

Arezzo

 Norman, United States
 Oświęcim, Poland
 Viseu, Portugal

Ariccia

 Cournon-d'Auvergne, France
 Lichtenfels, Germany
 Prestwick, Scotland, United Kingdom
 Santa Margherita di Belice, Italy

Arona

 Arona, Spain
 Compiègne, France
 Huy, Belgium

Ascoli Piceno

 Banská Bystrica, Slovakia
 Massy, France
 Trier, Germany

Assago

 Nozay, France
 Střelice, Czech Republic

Assisi

 Bethlehem, Palestine
 San Francisco, United States
 Santiago de Compostela, Spain
 Wadowice, Poland

Asti

 Biberach an der Riß, Germany
 Delano, United States
 Ma'alot-Tarshiha, Israel
 Miami, United States
 Valence, France
 Veliko Tarnovo, Bulgaria

Avezzano

 Ayacucho, Peru
 Belén, Argentina
 Câmpulung Moldovenesc, Romania
 Santa María, Argentina

B
Bagnacavallo

 Aix-Villemaur-Pâlis, France
 Neresheim, Germany
 Strzyżów, Poland

Barberino Tavarnelle

 Béboto, Chad
 Bodo, Chad
 Edchera, Western Sahara
 Fălticeni, Romania
 Gagny, France
 Hatvan, Hungary

 Schliersee, Germany
 Tangermünde, Germany

Barga

 East Lothian, Scotland, United Kingdom
 Gällivare, Sweden
 Hayange, France

Bari

 Banja Luka, Bosnia and Herzegovina
 Batumi, Georgia
 Corfu, Greece
 Durrës, Albania
 Guangzhou, China
 Kostroma, Russia
 Mar del Plata, Argentina
 Monte Sant'Angelo, Italy
 Palma de Mallorca, Spain
 Patras, Greece
 Podgorica, Montenegro
 San Giovanni Rotondo, Italy
 Słupsk, Poland
 Szczecin, Poland

Barletta
 Herceg Novi, Montenegro

Bassano del Grappa

 Mühlacker, Germany
 Voiron, France

Bellagio is a member of the Douzelage, a town twinning association of towns across the European Union, alongside with:

 Agros, Cyprus
 Altea, Spain
 Asikkala, Finland
 Bad Kötzting, Germany
 Bundoran, Ireland
 Chojna, Poland
 Granville, France
 Holstebro, Denmark
 Houffalize, Belgium
 Judenburg, Austria
 Kőszeg, Hungary
 Marsaskala, Malta
 Meerssen, Netherlands
 Niederanven, Luxembourg
 Oxelösund, Sweden
 Preveza, Greece
 Rokiškis, Lithuania
 Rovinj, Croatia
 Sesimbra, Portugal
 Sherborne, England, United Kingdom
 Sigulda, Latvia
 Siret, Romania
 Škofja Loka, Slovenia
 Sušice, Czech Republic
 Tryavna, Bulgaria
 Türi, Estonia
 Zvolen, Slovakia

Bergamo

 Bengbu, China

 Cochabamba, Bolivia
 Greenville, United States
 Mulhouse, France
 Olkusz, Poland
 Pueblo, United States
 Tver, Russia

Biella

 Arequipa, Peru
 Kiryū, Japan
 Tourcoing, France
 Weihai, China

Bientina
 Saint-Rémy-de-Provence, France

Bologna

 Coventry, England, United Kingdom
 Kharkiv, Ukraine
 Leipzig, Germany
 La Plata, Argentina
 Portland, United States
 Saint-Louis, Senegal
 San Carlos, Nicaragua
 St. Louis, United States
 Thessaloniki, Greece
 Toulouse, France
 Tuzla, Bosnia and Herzegovina
 Valencia, Spain
 Zagreb, Croatia

Bolzano

 Erlangen, Germany
 Sopron, Hungary

Borgo San Lorenzo
 Várpalota, Hungary

Bracciano

 Châtenay-Malabry, France
 Neusäß, Germany

Brescia

 Bethlehem, Palestine
 Darmstadt, Germany
 Logroño, Spain
 Troyes, France

Brixen

 Bled, Slovenia
 Havlíčkův Brod, Czech Republic
 Regensburg, Germany

Brugherio
 Le Puy-en-Velay, France

Bruneck

 Brignoles, France
 Groß-Gerau, Germany
 Szamotuły, Poland
 Tielt, Belgium

C

Ca
Caltanissetta

 Popayán, Colombia
 Rochester, United States

Camaiore

 Carpentras, France
 Castel di Casio, Italy
 L'Hôpital, France
 Rovinj, Croatia
 Überherrn, Germany

Campi Bisenzio

 Bir Lehlou, Western Sahara
 North Lanarkshire, Scotland, United Kingdom
 Orly, France
 Pallagorio, Italy

Cantù
 Dumfries, Scotland, United Kingdom

Capannori

 La Gaude, France
 Losheim am See, Germany
 Pillnitz (Dresden), Germany
 Pirna, Germany

Capo d'Orlando

 Culver City, United States
 Fremantle, Australia

Cappella Maggiore
 Earlston, Scotland, United Kingdom

Carmagnola

 Opatija, Croatia
 Río Tercero, Argentina

Carpi

 Oyonnax, France
 Wernigerode, Germany

Carrara

 Grasse, France
 Ingolstadt, Germany
 Kragujevac, Serbia
 Opole, Poland
 Yerevan, Armenia
 Yunfu, China

Casalecchio di Reno

 Pápa, Hungary
 Romainville, France
 Trenčín, Slovakia

Cascinette d'Ivrea
 Nový Bydžov, Czech Republic

Cassino

 Cavarzere, Italy
 Falaise, France

 Kolbuszowa, Poland
 North York (Toronto), Canada
 Ortona, Italy
 Richmond Valley, Australia
 Senglea, Malta
 Steglitz-Zehlendorf (Berlin), Germany
 Sterling Heights, United States
 Tychy, Poland
 Užice, Serbia

Castel San Pietro Terme

 Bad Salzschlirf, Germany
 Lovran, Croatia
 Matulji, Croatia
 Opatija, Croatia

Castelfranco Emilia
 Marktredwitz, Germany

Castelfranco Veneto
 Guelph, Canada

Castellarano

 Bruntál, Czech Republic
 Štúrovo, Slovakia

Castenaso

 Kamëz, Albania
 Rethymno, Greece

Castiglione del Lago

 Kopřivnice, Czech Republic
 Lempäälä, Finland
 Trappes, France

Catania

 Alexandria, Egypt
 Borgo Maggiore, San Marino
 Grenoble, France
 Kaliningrad, Russia
 Oświęcim County, Poland
 Ottawa, Canada

 Phoenix, United States

Catanzaro
 Bethlehem, Palestine

Cava de' Tirreni

 Gorzów Wielkopolski, Poland
 Kaunas, Lithuania
 Pittsfield, United States
 Schwerte, Germany

Ce–Ci
Ceprano
 Almendralejo, Spain

Cento

 L'Aquila, Italy
 Székesfehérvár, Hungary
 Vicente López, Argentina

Cerveteri

 Almuñécar, Spain
 Fürstenfeldbruck, Germany
 Livry-Gargan, France

Cesenatico

 Aubenas, France
 Schwarzenbek, Germany
 Sierre, Switzerland
 Zelzate, Belgium

Cherasco

 Aksakovo, Bulgaria
 Cefa, Romania
 Möckmühl, Germany
 Piliscsaba, Hungary
 Villars-sur-Var, France

Chieri

 Adria, Italy
 Épinal, France
 Nanoro, Burkina Faso
 Tolve, Italy

Cittadella

 Guben, Germany
 Noblesville, United States
 Nova Prata, Brazil

Civitanova Marche

 Esine, Italy
 General San Martín, Argentina
 Šibenik, Croatia
 Skawina, Poland

Co–Cu
Cogoleto

 Ober-Ramstadt, Germany
 Olympia, Greece
 Saint-André-les-Vergers, France

Collegno

 Antony, France
 Cerdanyola del Vallès, Spain
 Havířov, Czech Republic
 Neubrandenburg, Germany
 Oueslatia, Tunisia
 Rocchetta Sant'Antonio, Italy
 San Gregorio Magno, Italy
 Sarajevo, Bosnia and Herzegovina
 Sárospatak, Hungary
 Volzhsky, Russia

Comacchio
 Cres, Croatia

Como

 Fulda, Germany
 Jelgava, Latvia
 Nablus, Palestine
 Netanya, Israel
 Tōkamachi, Japan

Conselice

 Bitritto, Italy
 Bourgoin-Jallieu, France

Conselve

 Jászberény, Hungary
 Torcy, France

Corato
 Grenoble, France

Corsico

 Malakoff, France
 Mataró, Spain
 San Giovanni a Piro, Italy

Cortona

 Athens, United States
 Château-Chinon, France
 Krujë, Albania
 San José de los Remates, Nicaragua
 Valletta, Malta

Crema

 Melun, France
 Nanning, China

Cuneo

 Fürstenberg/Havel, Germany
 Nice, France
 Richard Toll, Senegal
 Santa Fe, Argentina

D
Delia
 Vaughan, Canada

Desenzano del Garda

 Amberg, Germany
 Antibes, France
 Sal, Cape Verde
 Wiener Neustadt, Austria

Dueville

 Calatayud, Spain
 Schorndorf, Germany
 Tulle, France

Duino-Aurisina

 Buje, Croatia
 Ilirska Bistrica, Slovenia
 Kolín, Czech Republic

E
Erba

 Fellbach, Germany
 Tain-l'Hermitage, France
 Tournon-sur-Rhône, France

Ercolano

 Heist-op-den-Berg, Belgium
 Xi'an, China

Este

 Bad Windsheim, Germany
 Bethlehem, Palestine
 Fredericksburg, United States
 Leek, England, United Kingdom
 Pertuis, France
 Rijeka, Croatia
 Tapolca, Hungary

F
Fabro 
 Bas-en-Basset, France

Faenza

 Bergerac, France
 Gmunden, Austria
 Jingdezhen, China
 Marousi, Greece
 Rijeka, Croatia
 Schwäbisch Gmünd, Germany
 Talavera de la Reina, Spain
 Timișoara, Romania
 Toki, Japan

Fano

 Mladá Boleslav, Czech Republic
 Rastatt, Germany
 Saint-Ouen-l'Aumône, France
 St Albans, England, United Kingdom
 Stříbro, Czech Republic

Feltre

 Bagnols-sur-Cèze, France
 Braunfels, Germany
 Carcaixent, Spain
 Dudelange, Luxembourg
 Eeklo, Belgium
 Kiskunfélegyháza, Hungary
 Newbury, England, United Kingdom

Ferentino

 Raszyn, Poland
 Rockford, United States
 San Severino Marche, Italy
 Yekaterinburg, Russia

Fermo

 Ansbach, Germany
 Bahía Blanca, Argentina
 Berat, Albania

Ferrara

 Broni, Italy
 Buenos Aires, Argentina
 Formia, Italy
 Giessen, Germany
 Highland Park, United States
 Kallithea, Greece
 Kaufbeuren, Germany
 Koper, Slovenia
 Krasnodar, Russia
 Lleida, Spain
 Prague 1 (Prague), Czech Republic
 Saint-Étienne, France
 Sarajevo, Bosnia and Herzegovina
 Swansea, Wales, United Kingdom
 Szombathely, Hungary

Fidenza

 Herrenberg, Germany
 Kremnica, Slovakia
 Kutná Hora, Czech Republic
 Sisteron, France

Florence

 Bethlehem, Palestine
 Budapest, Hungary
 Dresden, Germany
 Edinburgh, Scotland, United Kingdom
 Fez, Morocco
 Isfahan, Iran
 Kassel, Germany
 Kyiv, Ukraine
 Kuwait City, Kuwait
 Kyoto, Japan
 Nanjing, China
 Nazareth, Israel
 Philadelphia, United States
 Puebla, Mexico
 Reims, France
 Riga, Latvia
 Salvador, Brazil
 Sydney, Australia
 Tirana, Albania
 Turku, Finland
 Valladolid, Spain

Foggia

 L'Aquila, Italy
 Forlì, Italy
 Göppingen, Germany
 Pescasseroli, Italy
 Quimper, France
 Wałbrzych, Poland

Foligno

 Gemona del Friuli, Italy
 La Louvière, Belgium
 Shibukawa, Japan

Fondi
 Dachau, Germany

Forlì

 Aveiro, Portugal
 Bourges, France
 Elektrėnai, Lithuania
 Foggia, Italy
 Kaliningrad, Russia
 Peterborough, England, United Kingdom
 Płock, Poland
 Szolnok, Hungary

Formia

 Ferrara, Italy
 Fleury-les-Aubrais, France
 Gračanica, Bosnia and Herzegovina
 Haninge, Sweden
 Santeramo in Colle, Italy

Formigine

 Kilkenny, Ireland
 Saumur, France

Fossano

 Camponogara, Italy
 Długołęka, Poland
 Rafaela, Argentina

Fossombrone
 Entraigues-sur-la-Sorgue, France

Frascati

 Bad Godesberg (Bonn), Germany
 Kortrijk, Belgium
 Obninsk, Russia
 Saint-Cloud, France
 Windsor and Maidenhead, England, United Kingdom

Fratta Polesine
 Tulcea, Romania

Fucecchio
 Nogent-sur-Oise, France

Fusignano
 Biddulph, England, United Kingdom

G
Gaeta

 Cambridge, United States
 Frontignan, France
 Somerville, United States

Gallipoli

 Bethlehem, Palestine
 Monfalcone, Italy

Gela

 Elefsina, Greece
 Nordkapp, Norway
 Wittingen, Germany

Gemona del Friuli

 Foligno, Italy
 Laakirchen, Austria
 Velden am Wörther See, Austria

Genoa

 Beyoğlu, Turkey
 Columbus, United States
 Marseille, France
 Murcia, Spain
 Odesa, Ukraine
 Rijeka, Croatia
 Ryazan, Russia

Genzano di Roma

 Châtillon, France
 Merseburg, Germany

Gioia del Colle 
 Târgoviște, Romania

Gorizia

 Klagenfurt, Austria
 Lienz, Austria
 Sassari, Italy
 Zalaegerszeg, Hungary

Greve in Chianti

 Auxerre, France
 Brtonigla, Croatia
 Farsia, Western Sahara
 Greve, Denmark
 Jasenice, Croatia
 Rehoboth Beach, United States
 Sonoma, United States
 Ulvik, Norway
 Ushiku, Japan
 Veitshöchheim, Germany

Grosseto

 Birkirkara, Malta
 Cottbus, Germany
 Dimitrovgrad, Bulgaria
 Kashiwara, Japan

 Narbonne, France
 Saintes-Maries-de-la-Mer, France

Grottaferrata

 Bethlehem, Palestine
 Patmos, Greece
 Vandœuvre-lès-Nancy, France

Gualdo Tadino

 Audun-le-Tiche, France
 Krosno, Poland

Gubbio

 Godmanchester, England, United Kingdom
 Huntingdon, England, United Kingdom
 Jessup, United States
 Livinallongo del Col di Lana, Italy
 Salon-de-Provence, France
 Thann, France
 Wertheim, Germany

I
Imola

 Colchester, England, United Kingdom
 Gennevilliers, France
 Piła, Poland
 Pula, Croatia
 Weinheim, Germany

Imperia

 Friedrichshafen, Germany
 Newport, United States
 Rosario, Argentina

Iseo
 Tamsweg, Austria

J
Jesi

 Mayenne, France
 Waiblingen, Germany

L
Lainate

 Rosice, Czech Republic
 Strenči, Latvia

Lanciano

 Berazategui, Argentina
 Qala, Malta
 Vaughan, Canada
 Visegrád, Hungary

Langhirano

 Cavaillon, France
 Espalion, France
 Nove, Italy
 Tauste, Spain

Latina

 Farroupilha, Brazil
 Nova Gorica, Slovenia
 Palos de la Frontera, Spain

Lecce

 Benevento, Italy
 Murcia, Spain
 Ostrów Wielkopolski, Poland
 Skopje, North Macedonia
 Valladolid, Spain

Lecco

 Igualada, Spain
 Mâcon, France
 Mytishchi, Russia
 Overijse, Belgium
 Szombathely, Hungary

Ledro

 Buštěhrad, Czech Republic
 Chyňava, Czech Republic
 Doksy, Czech Republic
 Milín, Czech Republic
 Nový Knín, Czech Republic
 Příbram, Czech Republic
 Ptice, Czech Republic
 Všeň, Czech Republic

Livorno

 Bat Yam, Israel
 Guadalajara, Spain
 Haiphong, Vietnam
 Novorossiysk, Russia
 Oakland, United States

Lucca

 Abingdon-on-Thames, England, United Kingdom
 Colmar, France
 Hämeenlinna, Finland
 Schongau, Germany
 Sint-Niklaas, Belgium
 South San Francisco, United States

Lugo

 Agustín Codazzi, Colombia
 Choisy-le-Roi, France
 Kulmbach, Germany
 Nervesa della Battaglia, Italy
 Wexford, Ireland
 Yokneam Illit, Israel

M

Ma–Me
Macerata

 Issy-les-Moulineaux, France
 Floriana, Malta
 Kamëz, Albania
 Weiden in der Oberpfalz, Germany

Mantua

 Charleville-Mézières, France
 Madison, United States
 Nevers, France
 Ōmihachiman, Japan
 Oradea, Romania
 Pushkin, Russia
 Weingarten, Germany

Marino

 Boulogne-Billancourt, France
 Irving, United States
 Neukölln (Berlin), Germany

Marostica

 Kronstadt, Russia
 Montigny-le-Bretonneux, France
 São Bernardo do Campo, Brazil
 Tendō, Japan

Marsciano

 Jablonec nad Nisou, Czech Republic
 Loropéni, Burkina Faso
 Orosei, Italy
 Tremblay-en-France, France

Massa

 Bad Kissingen, Germany
 Vernon, France

Matera

 Oulu, Finland
 Petra, Jordan
 Toms River, United States

Medicina

 Romilly-sur-Seine, France
 Škofja Loka, Slovenia

Merano

 Pardubice, Czech Republic
 Salzburg, Austria

Messina

 Kronstadt, Russia
 Messini, Greece

Mi–Mo
Milan

 Bethlehem, Palestine
 Birmingham, England, United Kingdom
 Chicago, United States
 Daegu, South Korea
 Dakar, Senegal
 Frankfurt am Main, Germany
 Kraków, Poland
 Lyon, France
 Melbourne, Australia
 Osaka, Japan
 Saint Petersburg, Russia
 São Paulo, Brazil
 Shanghai, China
 Tel Aviv, Israel
 Toronto, Canada

Mira
 Leibnitz, Austria

Mirandola

 Ostfildern, Germany
 Villejuif, France

Modena

 Almaty, Kazakhstan
 Benxi, China
 Highland Park, United States
 Linz, Austria
 Londrina, Brazil
 Novi Sad, Serbia
 Saint Paul, United States

Moena
 Kirkwall, Scotland, United Kingdom

Molfetta

 Fremantle, Australia
 Görlitz, Germany

Monopoli

 Lugoj, Romania
 Lyss, Switzerland

Monreale
 San Ġwann, Malta

Monselice

 Niepołomice, Poland
 Parkano, Finland
 Poreč, Croatia

Monsummano Terme
 Décines-Charpieu, France

Montebelluna

 Chișineu-Criș, Romania
 Dammarie-lès-Lys, France
 Eppelheim, Germany

 Kocs, Hungary
 Oberkochen, Germany
 Tata, Hungary

Montecarlo

 Althen-des-Paluds, France
 Karlštejn, Czech Republic
 Reichenbach im Vogtland, Germany

Montecchio Maggiore

 Alton, England, United Kingdom
 Passau, Germany

Montegrotto Terme

 Alajuela, Costa Rica
 Băile Herculane, Romania
 Berettyóújfalu, Hungary
 Bordano, Italy
 Mason City, United States
 Mostar, Bosnia and Herzegovina
 Termas de Río Hondo, Argentina

Montesarchio

 Bethlehem, Palestine
 La Garde, France

Montesilvano

 Gradiška, Bosnia and Herzegovina
 Hajdúböszörmény, Hungary
 Trogir, Croatia

Montespertoli

 Caronia, Italy
 Épernay, France
 Neustadt an der Aisch, Germany
 Santo Stefano di Cadore, Italy

Montevarchi

 Bethlehem, Palestine
 Bir Lehlou, Western Sahara
 Kitzingen, Germany
 Roanne, France

Monza

 Indianapolis, United States
 Prague 1 (Prague), Czech Republic

N
Naples

 Baku, Azerbaijan
 Gafsa, Tunisia
 Kagoshima, Japan
 Nablus, Palestine
 Nosy Be, Madagascar
 Palma de Mallorca, Spain
 Santiago de Cuba, Cuba

Nardò

 Atlit (Hof HaCarmel), Israel
 Atri, Italy
 Conversano, Italy
 Fiorano Modenese, Italy
 Gyumri, Armenia
 Zitsa, Greece

Nettuno

 Ardee, Ireland
 Bandol, France

 Traunreut, Germany
 Wehr, Germany

Nichelino

 Caluire-et-Cuire, France
 Victoria, Malta

Nonantola

 Les Mureaux, France
 Olesa de Montserrat, Spain

Novara 

 Chalon-sur-Saône, France
 Koblenz, Germany

Novellara

 Neve Shalom (Mateh Yehuda), Israel
 Nový Jičín, Czech Republic
 Sancti Spíritus, Cuba
 Santa Gertrudes, Brazil
 Santo Stefano di Cadore, Italy

O
Ozzano dell'Emilia
 Staffanstorp, Sweden

P

Pa–Pe
Padua

 Beira, Mozambique
 Boston, United States
 Coimbra, Portugal
 Freiburg im Breisgau, Germany
 Handan, China
 Iaşi, Romania
 Nancy, France
 Oxford, England, United Kingdom
 Zadar, Croatia

Palazzolo Acreide
 Sikyona, Greece

Palermo

 Bethlehem, Palestine
 Bizerte, Tunisia
 Bukavu, Democratic Republic of the Congo
 Chengdu, China
 Düsseldorf, Germany
 Grand-Bassam, Ivory Coast
 Hanoi, Vietnam
 Khan Yunis, Palestine
 Miami, United States
 Montpellier, France
 Palermo, Colombia
 Samara, Russia
 Santiago de Cuba, Cuba
 Sestu, Italy
 Tbilisi, Georgia
 Timișoara, Romania
 Valletta, Malta
 Yaroslavl, Russia

Parabiago
 Samobor, Croatia

Parma

 Bourg-en-Bresse, France
 Ljubljana, Slovenia
 Shijiazhuang, China
 Stockton, United States
 Szeged, Hungary
 Tours, France
 Worms, Germany

Pavia

 Ayamé, Ivory Coast
 Besançon, France
 Bethlehem, Palestine
 Hersbruck, Germany
 Hildesheim, Germany
 Vilnius, Lithuania
 Zakynthos, Greece

Pavia di Udine
 Finkenstein am Faaker See, Austria

Pergine Valsugana
 Amstetten, Austria

Perugia

 Aix-en-Provence, France
 Bratislava, Slovakia
 Grand Rapids, United States
 Potsdam, Germany
 Seattle, United States
 Tübingen, Germany

Pesaro

 Kakegawa, Japan
 Keita, Niger
 Ljubljana, Slovenia
 Nanterre, France
 Qinhuangdao, China
 Rafah, Palestine
 Reșița, Romania

 Watford, England, United Kingdom

Pescantina
 Siedlce, Poland

Pesche
 Woodstock, Canada

Pescia

 Nerja, Spain
 Oullins, France

Pi–Pr
Piacenza

 Jajce, Bosnia and Herzegovina
 Plasencia, Spain
 Strumica, North Macedonia
 Tolyatti, Russia

Pietrasanta

 Écaussinnes, Belgium
 Grenzach-Wyhlen, Germany
 Montgomery, United States
 Villeparisis, France
 Zduńska Wola, Poland

Pinerolo

 Derventa, Bosnia and Herzegovina
 Gap, France
 San Francisco, Argentina
 Traunstein, Germany

Pisa

 Acre, Israel
 Akademgorodok (Novosibirsk), Russia
 Angers, France
 Hangzhou, China
 Iglesias, Italy
 Kolding, Denmark
 Niles, United States
 Ocala, United States
 Rhodes, Greece
 Santiago de Compostela, Spain
 Unna, Germany
 Valletta, Malta

Pistoia

 Kruševac, Serbia
 Pau, France
 Zittau, Germany

Poggibonsi

 Marcq-en-Barœul, France
 Werne, Germany

Pomezia

 Çanakkale, Turkey
 Itápolis, Brazil
 Singen, Germany

Pompei

 Gyeongju, South Korea
 Latiano, Italy

 Noto, Italy
 Tarragona, Spain
 Xi'an, China

Ponsacco

 Brignais, France
 Treuchtlingen, Germany

Pontassieve

 Griesheim, Germany
 Saint-Genis-Laval, France
 Znojmo, Czech Republic

Ponte San Nicolò

 Crest, France
 Dobra, Poland

Porcia

 Berettyóújfalu, Hungary
 Spittal an der Drau, Austria

Porto Ceresio
 Augustów, Poland

Prato

 Albemarle County, United States
 Bir Lehlou, Western Sahara 
 Changzhou, China
 Ebensee am Traunsee, Austria
 Nam Dinh, Vietnam
 Roubaix, France
 Sarajevo, Bosnia and Herzegovina
 Wangen im Allgäu, Germany

Q
Quartu Sant'Elena
 Los Alcarrizos, Dominican Republic

R
Racalmuto
 Hamilton, Canada

Ragusa

 Dubrovnik, Croatia
 Mosta, Malta
 Rădăuți, Romania

Ravenna

 Chartres, France
 Chichester, England, United Kingdom
 Speyer, Germany

Reggio Emilia

 Beit Jala, Palestine
 Bydgoszcz, Poland
 Chișinău, Moldova
 Dijon, France
 Fort Worth, United States
 Girona, Spain
 Kragujevac, Serbia
 Pemba, Mozambique
 Polokwane, South Africa
 Schwerin, Germany
 Zadar, Croatia

Rieti

 Itō, Japan
 Nordhorn, Germany
 Saint-Pierre-lès-Elbeuf, France

Rimini

 Fort Lauderdale, United States
 Saint-Maur-des-Fossés, France
 Seraing, Belgium
 Sochi, Russia
 Yangzhou, China
 Ziguinchor, Senegal

Rivoli

 Kranj, Slovenia
 Mollet del Vallès, Spain
 Montélimar, France
 Ravensburg, Germany

Rome
 Paris, France

Ronchi dei Legionari

 Metlika, Slovenia
 Wagna, Austria

Rovereto

 Bento Gonçalves, Brazil
 Dolní Dobrouč, Czech Republic
 Forchheim, Germany
 Kufstein, Austria
 Zabrze, Poland

Rovigo

 Bedford, England, United Kingdom
 Tulcea, Romania
 Viernheim, Germany

S

Sa
Sabaudia

 Saint-Médard-en-Jalles, France
 El Vendrell, Spain

Salerno

 Legnago, Italy

 Pazardzhik, Bulgaria
 Rouen, France
 Tōno, Japan

Salsomaggiore Terme

 Baikonur, Kazakhstan
 Hammam-Lif, Tunisia
 Luxeuil-les-Bains, France
 Yalta, Ukraine

Salzano
 Villefontaine, France

San Benedetto del Tronto

 Alfortville, France
 Chicago Heights, United States
 Mar del Plata, Argentina
 Šibenik, Croatia
 Steyr, Austria
 Trinidad, Cuba
 Viareggio, Italy

San Casciano in Val di Pesa

 Al Mahbes, Western Sahara
 Morgan Hill, United States
 Nieuwerkerken, Belgium
 Rosh Pinna, Israel

San Donà di Piave
 Villeneuve-sur-Lot, France

San Giuliano Milanese

 Bussy-Saint-Georges, France
 Curtea de Argeş, Romania

San Giuliano Terme

 Bad Tölz, Germany
 Vichy, France

San Giustino

 Carros, France
 Prudnik, Poland

San Miniato

 Apolda, Germany
 Bethlehem, Palestine
 Silly, Belgium
 Villeneuve-lès-Avignon, France

San Pietro in Cariano

 Ingelheim am Rhein, Germany
 Ludlow, England, United Kingdom
 Stans, Austria

San Vito al Tagliamento

 Nagyatád, Hungary
 Rixheim, France
 Sankt Veit an der Glan, Austria
 Stadtlohn, Germany

Sanremo

 Atami, Japan
 Helsingør, Denmark
 Karlskoga, Sweden

Santa Maria a Vico

 Caspe, Spain
 Gaillac, France

Santa Teresa di Riva
 Fuveau, France

Savona

 Bayamo, Cuba
 Mariupol, Ukraine
 Saona, Dominican Republic
 Villingen-Schwenningen, Germany

Sc–Se
Scandiano

 Almansa, Spain
 Blansko, Czech Republic
 Tubize, Belgium

Scandicci
 Pantin, France

Schio

 Kaposvár, Hungary
 Landshut, Germany
 Pétange, Luxembourg

Segrate

 Poreč, Croatia
 Sonsonate, El Salvador

Senigallia

 Chester, England, United Kingdom
 Lörrach, Germany
 Sens, France

Sesto Fiorentino

 Bagnolet, France
 Al Mahbes, Western Sahara
 Stefanaconi, Italy
 Wieliczka, Poland

Sesto San Giovanni

 Saint-Denis, France
 Zlín, Czech Republic

Sestri Levante

 Dole, France
 Santa Cruz, United States

Si–Sp
Siena

 Avignon, France
 Buffalo, United States
 Concord, United States
 Weimar, Germany
 Wetzlar, Germany

Signa

 Maromme, France
 Oberdrauburg, Austria
 Pukë, Albania

Solarino

 Moreland, Australia
 New Britain, United States

Sona

 Soyaux, France
 Wadowice, Poland
 Weiler bei Bingen, Germany

Sondrio

 Radovljica, Slovenia
 São Mateus, Brazil
 Sindelfingen, Germany

Sora
 Vaughan, Canada

Sorrento

 Eilat, Israel
 Kumano, Japan
 Mar del Plata, Argentina
 Nice, France
 San Martino Valle Caudina, Italy
 Santa Fe, United States
 Skien, Norway
 Taurasi, Italy

La Spezia

 Bayreuth, Germany
 Toulon, France
 Zhuhai, China

Spilimbergo

 La Châtre, France
 Sachsenburg, Austria

Spoleto

 Cajamarca, Peru
 Cetinje, Montenegro
 Charleston, United States
 Orange, France
 Schwetzingen, Germany

T
Taormina

 Abadan, Iran
 Contrexéville, France
 Sunny Isles Beach, United States
 Swieqi, Malta

Taranto

 Brest, France
 Donetsk, Ukraine
 Sparta, Greece

Tarcento

 Arnoldstein, Austria
 Bovec, Slovenia
 Unterföhring, Germany

Tavullia
 Vernon, Canada

Teramo

 Aglandjia, Cyprus
 Ávila, Spain
 Berane, Montenegro
 Gorzów Wielkopolski, Poland
 Memmingen, Germany
 Prague 7 (Prague), Czech Republic
 Ribeirão Preto, Brazil
 Rishon LeZion, Israel
 Strovolos, Cyprus

Termoli

 Chorzów, Poland
 Pompano Beach, United States

Terni

 Cartagena, Spain
 Dunaújváros, Hungary
 Saint-Ouen-sur-Seine, France

Terracina

 Bad Homburg vor der Höhe, Germany
 Cabourg, France
 Chur, Switzerland
 Exeter, England, United Kingdom
 Jūrmala, Latvia
 Mayrhofen, Austria
 Mondorf-les-Bains, Luxembourg
 Pécs, Hungary

Thiene
 Apt, France

Tolfa

 Biograd na Moru, Croatia
 Dingle, Ireland
 Għajnsielem, Malta
 Slovenske Konjice, Slovenia

Torremaggiore

 Buffalo, United States
 Canosa di Puglia, Italy
 Villafalletto, Italy

Tremosine sul Garda
 North Adams, United States

Trento

 Charlottenburg-Wilmersdorf (Berlin), Germany
 Kempten, Germany
 Prague 1 (Prague), Czech Republic
 San Sebastián, Spain

Trieste

 Graz, Austria
 Mykolaiv, Ukraine
 Santos, Brazil
 Southampton, England, United Kingdom

Turin

 Chambéry, France
 Cologne, Germany
 Córdoba, Argentina
 Detroit, United States
 Esch-sur-Alzette, Luxembourg
 Gaza City, Palestine
 Glasgow, Scotland, United Kingdom
 Liège, Belgium
 Lille, France
 Nagoya, Japan
 Quetzaltenango, Guatemala
 Rosario, Argentina
 Rotterdam, Netherlands
 Salt Lake City, United States
 Shenyang, China

U
Udine

 Albacete, Spain
 Esslingen am Neckar, Germany
 Maribor, Slovenia
 Neath Port Talbot, Wales, United Kingdom

 Schiedam, Netherlands
 Vienne, France
 Villach, Austria
 Windsor, Canada
 Yaoundé, Cameroon

V
Varedo
 Champagnole, France

Varese

 Alba Iulia, Romania
 Romans-sur-Isère, France

Velletri

 Esch-sur-Alzette, Luxembourg
 Mödling, Austria
 Offenbach am Main, Germany
 Puteaux, France
 Zemun (Belgrade), Serbia

Venice

 Dubrovnik, Croatia
 Istanbul, Turkey
 Saint Petersburg, Russia
 Sarajevo, Bosnia and Herzegovina
 Suzhou, China
 Tallinn, Estonia
 Yerevan, Armenia

Verbania

 Bethlehem, Palestine
 Bourg-de-Péage, France
 Crikvenica, Croatia
 East Grinstead, England, United Kingdom
 Mindelheim, Germany
 Piatra Neamț, Romania
 Sant Feliu de Guíxols, Spain
 Schwaz, Austria

Vercelli

 Arles, France
 Tortosa, Spain

Verona

 Albany, United States
 Johannesburg, South Africa
 Munich, Germany
 Nagahama, Japan
 Nîmes, France
 Pula, Croatia
 Saint-Josse-ten-Noode, Belgium
 Salzburg, Austria

Vicenza

 Annecy, France
 Bethlehem, Palestine
 Cleveland, United States
 Guiyang, China
 Osijek, Croatia
 Pforzheim, Germany

Z
Zanè
 Pag, Croatia

References

Italy
Lists of cities in Italy
Foreign relations of Italy
Italy geography-related lists
Populated places in Italy